Meld or melding can refer to:
Meld (cards), displaying a set of cards to other players
David Melding, a Welsh politician

See also
 Meld (disambiguation)